Annunciation High School was a coeducational Catholic high school in Detroit, Michigan.  The school was opened in 1915 and was operated by the Sisters, Servants of the Immaculate Heart of Mary.  The school closed in 1967.

References

High schools in Detroit
Defunct Catholic secondary schools in Michigan